Stone Barn Farm is one of a small number of surviving farm properties on Mount Desert Island off the coast of Maine.  Located at the junction of Crooked Road and Norway Drive, the farm has a distinctive stone barn, built in 1907, along with a c. 1850 Greek Revival farm house and carriage barn.  The property was listed on the National Register of Historic Places in 2001, and is subject to a conservation easement held by the Maine Coast Heritage Trust.

Description and history
Stone Barn Farm occupies  of land in north-central Bar Harbor, a rural inland area of the fashionable resort community. The farm complex is set near Crooked Road, and consists of a wood-frame house and carriage barn, and an unusual gambrel-roofed barn whose first level is stone and granite (the latter quarried from nearby Otter Creek). As of 2020, only its southern gambrel end is clapboarded. The house is 1-1/2 stories in height, with a three-bay gabled front sheltered by a hip-roofed porch. Two additions extend to the rear of the building. The carriage house a single-story clapboarded structure with a gable roof, and a track-mounted sliding door providing access to its interior. The stone barn is fashioned out of glacial till, and has a two-leaf board-and-batten door providing access to its interior.

The farmhouse and carriage house were probably built sometime between 1850 and 1860, based on their architectural style, although local histories have placed the farmhouse construction as early as 1840. In 1907 Paine's son, Willis, sold the farm to the Shea Brothers masonry firm, who may have built the stone barn as a vehicle to showcase their building skills. The Sheas eventually leased the property back to the Paines for a time. In 1963, the property was acquired by Harry and Mary "Cindy" Owen, who granted the Maine Coast Heritage Trust (MCHT) a conservation easement on the property in 2001. MCHT purchased the property in 2019 for $625,000.

See also
National Register of Historic Places listings in Hancock County, Maine

References

External links
"An Old Farmer Saves an Old Barn" - Down East Magazine

Farms on the National Register of Historic Places in Maine
Georgian architecture in Maine
Buildings and structures completed in 1850
Buildings and structures in Bar Harbor, Maine
Historic districts on the National Register of Historic Places in Maine
National Register of Historic Places in Hancock County, Maine